Diego Sánchez Pérez (born 18 July 2003) is a Spanish professional footballer who plays as a left back for Sporting de Gijón B.

Club career
Born in Avilés, Asturias, Sánchez joined Sporting de Gijón's Mareo in 2011, aged eight. He made his senior debut with the reserves on 14 February 2021, coming on as a late substitute in a 0–1 Segunda División B away loss against CD Lealtad.

Sánchez scored his first senior goal on 16 May 2021, netting the B's third in a 3–1 home win over CD Guijuelo, as both sides were already relegated. On 23 July, he renewed his contract for a further two seasons, being definitely assigned to the reserve side.

Sánchez made his first team debut on 29 May 2022, replacing fellow youth graduate Pablo García in a 0–1 home loss against UD Las Palmas in the Segunda División.

References

External links

2003 births
Living people
People from Avilés
Spanish footballers
Footballers from Asturias
Association football defenders
Segunda División players
Segunda División B players
Tercera Federación players
Sporting de Gijón B players
Sporting de Gijón players